Santa Eulalia del Campo is a municipality located in the province of Teruel, Aragon, Spain. According to the 2005 census (INE), the municipality has a population of 1,171 inhabitants.

This town is located near Sierra Palomera, a mountain range of the Sistema Ibérico.

Tourism
The surroundings of the Chapel of the Mill; Sierra Palomera with a view of the former premises of the Sugar Factory; Jiloca; the Media Caseta Mount or Mount Cirogrillos; Railway Station Via Minero Peirón of the Virgen del Pilar - on the road to the Tremedal Orihuela - are some of the tourist attractions.

References

Municipalities in the Province of Teruel